Stiftelsen, meaning "the Foundation", is a Swedish pop rock band that features the vocals of Robert Pettersson, the lead singer of the Swedish pop-rock band Takida. Pettersson wanted to do projects different from the staple of Takida music. That's when he met Micke Eriksson, Arne Johansson and Martin Källström and they formed Stiftelsen in the summer of 2010. The band is signed to Universal Music Sweden and has a variety of musical influences from dansband and country. They had a hit in Sweden with their single "Vart jag än går" (meaning Wherever I go), released on 30 May 2012.

Members
Robert Pettersson (vocals) - lead singer of Takida
Micke Eriksson (guitar) - formerly member of Swedish band Willy & The Hitchhikers
Arne Johansson (bass) - also from Willy & The Hitchhikers
Martin Källström (drums) - formerly from Swedish metal band Corroded

Discography

Albums

Singles

Notes

References

External links
Facebook

Swedish pop rock music groups